The Millennium Centre was located in Littleover, Derby.
It was a post-16 sixth form centre, run jointly by Derby Moor Community Sports College Trust and Littleover Community School for students who wished to further their education by completing A Levels. The majority of students come from the two schools. The sixth form had joint heads who were initially; Jamie Henshaw for Derby Moor and Rob Archer for Littleover.  The Millennium Centre was split between the two schools, after a decade of cooperation.

External links
 The Millennium Centre
  Derby Moor Community Sports College
 Littleover Community School

References

Defunct schools in Derby